

History

St. Karen's Secondary School, Patna was founded in the year 1990 by Mr. Donald Patrick Galstaun and his wife Lesley Barbara Galstaun.

The school derives its name from the novel Karen written by Marie Killilea in 1952. St. Karen's Secondary School is a minority Anglo-Indian Christian institution and has been established by The Anglo–Indian Educational Society of St. Karen's, which is a registered body.

Location

The main school campus is located in Bailey Road, Rukunpura, Patna area of Patna. St. Karen's Montessori School is a branch of the St. Karen's High School located in Danapur area of Patna.

Curriculum

The school is affiliated to the Central Board of Secondary Education, New Delhi.

Subjects

English
Hindi
Mathematics
Sanskrit
Science (Physics, Chemistry, Biology)
Value Education/Moral Science
Social Science 
Computer Studies
Physical Training

Schools in Patna
Montessori schools in India
1990 establishments in Bihar
Educational institutions established in 1990